Jeszkotle  (German Jäschkittel) is a village in the administrative district of Gmina Grodków, within Brzeg County, Opole Voivodeship, south-western Poland (Silesia).

References

Jeszkotle